Chinese New Year's Eve (Lunar New Year's Eve) is the day before the Chinese New Year (Lunar New Year). Celebrating Chinese 
(Lunar) New Year’s Eve has always been a family matter in Asia, it is the reunion day for every Asian family. It has evolved over a long period of time. The origin of Asian Lunar New Year’s Eve can be traced back to 3500 years ago.

History 
Chinese New Year's Eve originated in the Shang Dynasty (1600 – 1046 BC), when Chinese held sacrificial ceremonies in honour of gods and ancestors at the end of each year. Then in the Zhou Dynasty (1046 – 256 BC), the phrase “Nian (Year)”appeared and certain cultural practices became popular among Chinese such as sending door god, burning bamboo.

The first dated Chinese New Year's Eve was recorded during Warring States period (475 BC – 221 AD). In Lüshi Chunqiu, an exorcistic ritual called "Big Nuo" (大傩) was recorded being carried out in the ending day of a year to expel illness in Qin (state). It was derived from an earlier ritual, Nuo (傩), which is the origin of Chinese New Year's Eve. Later, Qin unified China and founded the Qin dynasty, the ritual was continued. It evolved to cleaning up houses thoroughly in the preceding days of Chinese New Year.

During the Jin dynasty (266 – 420 AD), people started to do the “Shousui (守岁)” tradition on New Year's Eve. It was recorded by Western Jin's general Zhou Chu's article Fengtu Ji (风土记): "At the ending of a year, people gift and wish each other, calling it Kuisui (馈岁); people invite others with drinks and food, calling it Biesui (别岁); on the new year's eve, people stayed up all night until sunrise, calling it Shousui (守岁)". The article used the word "除夕 (Chuxi)" to indicate new year's eve, and the name is still used till this day.

Dates of Chinese New Year’s Eve 
Since the traditional Chinese calendar uses the lunisolar calendar, there's no fixed date for Chinese New Year’s Eve. Below is the table for the dates of Chinese New Year's Eve from 2011 to 2031.

Traditions 
Chinese New Year's Eve’s practice is the cluster of this festival’s history and tradition for thousands of years,  there are many practices in China which are varied as people in different regions have different customs. Most of the practices exists for thousands years and still being used nowadays.

Gathering 
In most parts of China, especially in the south, people are used to having grand family banquets to celebrate Chinese New Year's Eve which is known as “Happy gathering”. Since it is the last meal of the year, all the family members must sit together to enjoy the delicious family traditional dishes and everybody in the family is allowed to and encouraged to drink. Before the happy gathering, each family must offer a sacrifice to ancestors, usually three or four generations of the dead. The family must set a table with various dishes and provide a seat for each ancestor, then the eldest member of the family pours drinks for them. After burning some joss sticks and candles, the ancestors are supposed to begin to eat, and the whole family members should worship them on bended knees and kowtow. After the grand family banquet, all family members sit together around fireplace, chatting, singing, laughing or playing cards and stay up late to the dawn of next morning.

Gala TV show 
The spring festival gala is a TV show which broadcasts live by China's Central Television on Lunar New Year’s Eve with singing, dancing, sketch comedy and cross-talk. It usually takes 6 months to do the preparation. Since more and more Chinese families could afford television from 1980s, the spring festival gala has been institutionalised as a crucial practice of Chinese New Year’s Eve, every family member sits in front of the TV, watching spring festival gala together. The spring festival gala will broadcast until midnight, everyone in front of the televisions will say "Happy New Year" at midnight with the hosts.

Burning of bamboo and use of firecrackers 
There's an ancient myth that a devil who lived in western mountains, people would fall ill if come across it,  but the devil is afraid of the sound of bamboo. So Chinese will burn bamboo to make the sound to keep the devil out of their house on Chinese New Year's Eve. Nowadays, Chinese people still like to light firecrackers instead of bamboo on Chinese New Year's Eve not just for keeping devil out, but also for having fun.

The Kitchen God 

The Chinese kitchen god is regarded as the ambassador of the Jade Emperor to each Chinese family. It is said that at the midnight of Chinese New Year’s Eve, the kitchen god from each family should go to heaven to report the family’s deeds during the year. On lunar new year, the kitchen god returns to the earth and each family welcomes him by pasting a new picture of him in the kitchen.

Inviting a Door God 

On Chinese New Year’s Eve, each family would invite the door god by pasting its picture on the front door as a talisman to forbid any devil to enter the family. The most popular door gods are Zhong kui, Qin shubao and Yu chigong in different area of China.

Peach wood 
On Chinese New Year's Eve, Chinese will make bow of peach wood to exorcise the devil that caused plagues, which dates back to the Qin Dynasty. The ghost would do no harm to man, but the ancients were afraid of them, so they asked for help to drive the ghost away. The entrance-guarding god was closely related to festivals and peach wood was regarded as a supernatural force with which ghosts could be driven away.

Traditional foods for Chinese New Year’s Eve 
Family reunion dinner is crucial to Chinese. Chinese New Year’s Eve feast allows every family members to sit together. It takes days to do the preparation. Every dish on Chinese New Year’s Eve have different meanings. Some of the most popular dishes are:

Spring Rolls 
Spring rolls is a traditional dish in East China. It is a Cantonese dish which people make the thin dough wrappers in the cylindrical-shaped rolls and fill them with vegetables, meat, or something sweet, then fried the spring rolls to give them a golden-yellow color.

Dumplings 
The dumpling is a traditional food to eat in north China on Chinese New Year’s Eve while in southern China very few people serve dumplings as Lunar New Year’s Eve dinner. Minced meat (pork, shrimp, chicken, beef.etc.) and vegetables are wrapped in the elastic dough skin. Boiling, steaming, frying are the most common ways to cook dumplings in China.

Glutinous Rice Cake 

Glutinous Rice Cake is called "Nian Gao" in mandarin. The sound of Nian Gao has a good meaning: getting higher year by year. Glutinous Rice Cake is made of sticky rice, sugar, chestnuts, lotus leaves. It is a common dish which appeared in the southern Chinese families' Lunar New Year Eve  reunion dinner.

Good Fortune Fruit 

Tangerines, oranges and pomelos are certain fruits that been eaten on Lunar New Year's Eve.  Chinese believe that eating these fruits on Chinese New Year's Eve can bring fortune as these fruits have round shape, golden colour, lucky sounds when spoken which symbolise fullness and wealth.

Longevity Noodles 
Longevity noodles represents Chinese' wish for longevity. The length and preparation of longevity noodles are the symbolic of eater's life. Longevity noodles are longer than normal noodles, usually fried or boiled and served in the bowl.

Money gift and Money tree 
Chinese will give children money gifts as lunar new year gift on Chinese New Year's Eve. They usually put money in red pockets and hide under their children's pillows. In ancient time, Chinese money is the round copper coin with a square hole in the middle. adults will thread the coins with colourful thread to make a shape of dragon and then they will put the money beside their children's beds while their children are asleep. this customs, which is very similar to Christmas gifts in west.

A money tree is a legendary tree which will shed coins when shaken. On Chinese New Year's Eve, Chinese will cut some pine branches and put the branches in vase. Then they will tie copper coins, shoe-shaped gold or silver and pomegranate flowers to the tree, which is very similar to Christmas tree in western countries.

Similar traditions in other part of Asia

Philippines 
Chinese New Year's Eve in Philippines is called Bisperas ng Bagong Taon in Tagalog. On Chinese New Year's Eve, all doors including cupboards, drawers, cabinets, windows must be left wide open to allow good luck to enter. Chinese Filipinos do not eat fish and chicken on Chinese New Year's Eve as these animals scrounge for food and Chinese Filipinos do not want to scrounge for food in the upcoming year. They prepare twelve round fruits (oranges, grapes, clementines, cantaloupe etc.) on Chinese New Year's Eve and each fruit represents a month.

Taboos 
On Chinese New Year's Eve, all cleaning tools such as brooms, brushes, dusters must be put away. Chinese people clean on Chinese New Year's Eve as they believe that if they do sweep or dust on New Year's Day, their good fortune will be swept away. The cleaning begins at the door, the dust and rubbish are swept to the middle of the room, then placed in the corners and not taken until the fifth day.

During the new year period, the use of scissors, knives, and other sharp objects is avoided. The thinking is that sharp objects will cut your stream of wealth and success for the whole year. All knives in the houses must be put away on Chinese New Year’s Eve.

The Chinese character for hair is the same first character in the word for prosper. This means washing or cutting it off is seen as washing your fortune away and dramatically reduces the chances of prosperity in the year ahead. To this end, the Chinese avoid having their hair cut until the second day of the new year when all festivities are concluded.

References

External links
 

Chinese New Year
Festivals in Korea
Festivals in Vietnam
Lunar observation
Observances set by the Chinese calendar
Winter events in China
Festivals in China